The Malesian frog, Malaysian river frog, Malaysian peat frog, or peat swamp frog (Limnonectes malesianus) is a species of frog in the family Dicroglossidae. It is found on the Malay Peninsula (including extreme southern peninsular Thailand and Singapore), Sumatra, Java, Borneo (Indonesia, Malaysia), and a range of islands on the Sunda Shelf (Pulau Kundur, Palau Gallang, Great Natuna Island, Sinkeo Island).
Its natural habitats are shallow, gentle streams and nearby swampy areas including peat swamps, very flat alluvial forests, and overgrown plantations. It is becoming rare due to habitat loss (deforestation), and to a lesser extent, exploitation.

References

External links
Amphibian and Reptiles of Peninsular Malaysia - Limnonectes malesianus

Limnonectes
Amphibians of Indonesia
Amphibians of Malaysia
Amphibians of Singapore
Amphibians of Thailand
Taxonomy articles created by Polbot
Amphibians described in 1984